The Ambassador of the United Kingdom to the Holy See has held that title since 1982. Before that the British heads of mission to the Holy See were styled Attaché resident at Rome and Envoy Extraordinary and Minister Plenipotentiary.

History of representation
Diplomatic relations were broken off between the Pope and the Kingdom of England in 1534, after the Act of Supremacy of that year declared that King Henry VIII was "the only Supreme Head in Earth of the Church of England". This break continued throughout the remaining existence of the Kingdom of England and its successor the Kingdom of Great Britain (1707–1800). However, after the formation of the United Kingdom of Great Britain and Ireland an "unofficial official" was kept in Rome from the mid-nineteenth century, holding the title of representative to the Papal States. With the rise of Italian nationalism, the Papal States were conquered by the House of Savoy and a unified Kingdom of Italy was declared in 1861. In 1874, due to the Roman Question, the Conservative government withdrew this representative, reasoning that it was not cost-effective to maintain a representative to a "non-existent state". Missions between 1874 and 1914 were designated "special and temporary". 

In 1914 the United Kingdom formally re-established diplomatic relations with the Holy See. A minister was sent to the papal court during the First World War to court the favour of the Pope towards the Triple Entente. This mission was maintained after the war for the perceived value of its prestige (a "quiet place for a not very distinguished diplomat") and the conflicts in Ireland, Malta, Quebec, and Australia, which had Roman Catholic dimensions. After the rupture in 1930–33 due to difficulties in Malta, the post was filled with more experienced and respected diplomats.

From 1914 to 1982 the diplomatic representative of the United Kingdom to the Holy See had the rank of Envoy Extraordinary and Minister Plenipotentiary, as did the UK's representatives to many other countries until the 1960s, but partly because there was already a British ambassador in Rome, to Italy. The British envoy to the Holy See was upgraded to Ambassador in 1982. It has been claimed that the Minister was always a Protestant, and that Francis Campbell, appointed ambassador in 2005, was "the first Catholic to hold the position of emissary of the Court of St James to the Holy See since the Reformation"; in fact, however, the first two 20th-century envoys, Sir Henry Howard and Count de Salis, were Catholics.

List of heads of mission

Attachés resident at Rome
The United Kingdom was represented by an Attaché to the legation at Florence resident at Rome.
1832–1844: Thomas Aubin
1844–1853: William Petre
1853–1858: Richard Lyons
1858–1870: Odo Russell
1870–1874: Henry Clarke Jervoise
1874: post abolished

Envoys Extraordinary and Ministers Plenipotentiary
1914–1916: Sir Henry Howard
1916–1923: John Francis Charles, 7th Count de Salis-Soglio
1922–1928: Hon. Sir Odo Russell
1928–1930: Sir Henry Chilton

Relations downgraded due to the Church's interference in Maltese politics

Chargés d'affaires
1930–1932: George Ogilvie-Forbes
1932–1933: Sir Ivone Kirkpatrick

Envoys Extraordinary and Ministers Plenipotentiary
1933–1934: Sir Robert Clive
1934–1936: Sir Charles Wingfield
1936–1947: Sir D'Arcy Osborne
1947–1951: Sir Victor Perowne
1951–1954: Sir Walter Roberts
1954–1957: Sir Douglas Howard
1957–1960: Sir Marcus Cheke
1960–1965: Sir Peter Scarlett
1965–1970: Sir Michael Williams
1970–1975: Desmond Crawley
1975–1977: Dugald Malcolm
1978–1980: Geoffrey Crossley
1980–1982: Sir Mark Heath

Ambassadors
1982–1985: Sir Mark Heath
1985–1988: David Lane
1988–1991: John Broadley
1991–1995: Andrew Palmer
1995–1998: Maureen MacGlashan
1998–2002: Mark Pellew
2002–2005: Kathryn Colvin
2005–2011: Francis Campbell
2011–2011: George Edgar (chargé d'affaires)
2011–2016: Nigel Baker
2016–2021: Sally Axworthy

2021–: Christopher Trott

Notes

See also
Holy See–United Kingdom relations

References
Chadwick, Owen (1988) Britain and the Vatican During the Second World War, Cambridge University Press

External links
UK and Holy See, gov.uk

Holy See
 
United Kingdom